Peter Nectario Tsekenis (born 4 August 1973) is an Australian former professional soccer player who played as a defender and the current coach of Marconi Stallions.

Career
Born in Sydney, Tsekenis played at club level for St George, Sydney Olympic, Newcastle United and Belmore Hercules, before becoming player-manager of Bankstown City Lions.

He also participated at the 1996 Summer Olympics.

In 2011, Tsekenis returned to Sydney Olympic Football Club as coach of their first grade side. By April 2019 he was coaching Marconi Stallions.

Personal life
He is of Greek descent.

References

External links
 
 
 

1973 births
Living people
Australian people of Greek descent
Australian soccer players
Australian soccer coaches
Olympic soccer players of Australia
Footballers at the 1996 Summer Olympics
Sydney Olympic FC players
Newcastle Jets FC players
Bankstown City FC players
Association football defenders
St George FC players
Marconi Stallions FC managers